Seregno is a town and comune of the new Province of Monza and Brianza in the Italian region of Lombardy.  Seregno received the honorary title of city with a presidential decree on 26 January 1979.

It is served by Seregno railway station.

Geography
The city is located in the upper part of the Lombard plain,  from Monza and only  from Milan, capital of the Region. The current infrastructure system, with two longitudinal bisecting roads and a thick mesh of provincial and municipal roads and railways make Seregno also very close to all the major attractions of the area such as the lake districts, the Alps, the cities of Como, Lecco, Bergamo and Varese.

Main sights
Basilica church of St. Joseph (18th century)
Landriani Caponaghi Palace, the current town hall
Odescalchi Villa
 Barbarossa Tower

Economy 
Seregno is positioned in the middle of one of the most economically productive areas in Italy with a high concentration of small and medium-sized enterprises. The total number of companies listed in Seregno is over 3,600, equal to about 6 percent of companies throughout the Province of Monza and Brianza territory. Seregno has a long-established tradition in industrial and craft production with excellence in the furniture sector, engineering industry, clothing and computer industries.

A peculiarity of Seregno is the presence of a high number of bank agencies in relation to the resident population and businesses located within the city boundaries.

People 
 Luca Caldirola, football player
 Alan Caligiuri, (1981), Deejay
 Igor Cassina, (1977), Olympic winner gymnast
 Piero Lissoni, architect and designer
 Roberto Mandressi, football player
 Marco Mapelli, racing driver
 Ettore Pozzoli, musician and pianist
 Riccardo Trabattoni (2001), student, actor and broker
 Carlo Villa, football player
 Iago Longoni, student, former football player and historian

Culture
The International Ettore Pozzoli Piano Competition, for tradition and amount of prize, is one of the oldest and most prestigious piano competitions in the world taking place in Seregno, Italy since 1959 and held every two years.

Twin towns
Seregno is twinned with:

  Sant'Agata di Esaro, Italy

References

Sources
 G. Ferrarini, A. Stadiotti, M. Stadiotti (a cura di). Seregno: Un paese, la sua storia, la sua anima. Telesio editrice, Carnate, 1999.
E. Mariani. Storia di Seregno – Circolo Culturale Seregn de la memoria. Seregno, 1963.
 G. Picasso e M. Tagliabue (a cura di). Seregno. Una comunità di Brianza nella storia (secoli XI – XX) Comune di Seregno, Seregno, 1994.

External links
Official City website 
 International Ettore Pozzoli Piano Competition Official web site